The Château de Fondat is a château in the French commune of Saint-Justin, in Landes, Nouvelle-Aquitaine, France. It was built in the Neo-Renaissance style in the 17th century, and became classified as a National Heritage Site of France, a Monument historique, on 31 March 1999.

History
The lords of the region occupied the Fondat estate from the Middle Ages onwards, but in 1607, a noble family from Marsan bought it, keeping it until the end of the 16th century. The château has been destroyed on two occasions, and in the middle of the 17th century it was reconstructed. Later, in the 19th century, it was renovated once more in the Neo-Renaissance style.

This château is one part of a larger group of outbuildings, including:
 An armagnac storehouse constructed in the 16th/17th century
 A dovecote from the 17th century
 The Grand Pavilion which was renovated in the 19th century to fit the image of the Château itself
 A Medici fountain
 A fishpond from the 17th century, which is used as a fish reserve
 A park with exotic trees which are approximately 200 years old

Gallery

Notes

Châteaux in Landes (department)
Houses completed in the 17th century
Monuments historiques of Nouvelle-Aquitaine
Renaissance architecture in France